Havis, Inc. is an American manufacturer of in-vehicle mobile office and prisoner transport products for private and public corporate, military and law enforcement, and enterprise fleets. Founded in Philadelphia and now headquartered in Warminster, Pennsylvania, Havis serves numerous industries including, but not limited to: public safety, military and government, utility and public works, energy services, transportation, material handling, and other mobile professions. Along with its factory in Warminster, Havis also operates a satellite office in Plymouth, Michigan.

History 
Havis began in 1928 as the Havis-Shields Equipment Corporation, named for founders Dan Havis and Jim Shields. Havis-Shields supplied heavy duty automotive and electrical equipment to police departments and other areas of the public sector.

By the early 1980s, the company had branched into manufacturing, selling high-intensity scene lighting to the public safety sector. In 2009, the company announced a merger with LEDCO-ChargeGuard. Havis-Shields was renamed to Havis, Inc.

In 2011, Havis announced the sale of its Lighting Solutions product line of Kwik-Raze, Magnafire, Collins Dynamics, and Quester to R-O- M Corporation in order to focus more on its current product lines of docking stations, prisoner and K9 transport, and integrated control systems.

In 2014, Havis acquired long-time partner, Schlotter Precision Products, a manufacturer of plastic parts and molds, and formed Havis Molding.

Havis has been at its Warminster headquarters since 2002, with an on-site expansion completed in the summer of 2016.

Corporate overview 
Havis is led by CEO Joe Bernert, his team of Executive Directors, and a number of small teams that focus on marketing, customer service, engineering, ISO certification, and other fields. Havis employs more than 300 workers who build and install company products.

Havis became an ISO 9001: 2008 certified company in 2012.

Markets served 
Havis, Inc. serves several different industries.
 Public Safety
 Military and Government
 Utility and Public Works
 Material Handling
 Transportation
 Healthcare
 Mobile Professionals

Associations 
 NAFA Fleet Management Association
 NTEA
 MHI
Automotive Fleet & Leasing Association (AFLA)
International Association of Chiefs of Police (IACP)
National Rural Electric Cooperative Association (NRECA)
Rocky Mountain Fleet Management Association (RMFMA)
 VDC Research Group
United States Police Canine Association (USPCA)
 Los Angeles Police Foundation
 Sheriff’s Association of Texas

Partnerships 
Havis, Inc.'s partners include Dell, Panasonic, Whelen, Getac, Ford, Chevrolet, Dodge, NetMotion Wireless, Sierra Wireless, Ace K9, Brother, Motorola, and many more.

In the media 
Havis products have been featured in numerous television series, including Storm Chasers, Blue Bloods, Dateline NBC, Jeopardy!, Alaska State Troopers, NCIS, Law & Order, Major Crimes, and more.

Awards 
Havis won the Cygnus Law Enforcement Innovation Award for its K9 inserts.

References

External links 
 
 Philly.com

Transportation
Police vehicles
Mobile computers
Manufacturing companies based in Pennsylvania
Companies based in Bucks County, Pennsylvania
Privately held companies based in Pennsylvania
American companies established in 1928
Manufacturing companies established in 1928
1928 establishments in Pennsylvania